The third season of Charmed, an American supernatural drama television series created by Constance M. Burge, originally aired in the United States on The WB from October 5, 2000 through May 17, 2001. Paramount Home Entertainment released the complete third season in a six-disc box set on November 15, 2005.

The series follows the adventures of Prue (Shannen Doherty), Piper (Holly Marie Combs) and Phoebe Halliwell (Alyssa Milano), three sisters who discover they are the Charmed Ones, the most powerful good witches of all time who use their combined Power of Three to protect innocents from evil beings. Other regular cast members include Brian Krause as Leo Wyatt and Dorian Gregory as Darryl Morris, both of whom return from the previous season as well as Julian McMahon as Cole Turner, who is introduced in the premiere.

It is the last season to feature original cast member Shannen Doherty, as she left the series at the end of the season.

Cast and Characters

Main 
 Shannen Doherty as Prue Halliwell
 Holly Marie Combs as Piper Halliwell
 Alyssa Milano as Phoebe Halliwell
 Brian Krause as Leo Wyatt
 Dorian Gregory as Darryl Morris
 Julian McMahon as Cole Turner

Special Guest 
 Ron Perlman as Kellman

Recurring
 Amir Aboulela as Triad Member #1
 Shaun Toub as Triad Member #2
 Rick Overton as Triad Member #3
 Keith Diamond as Reece Davidson
 James Read as Victor Bennett
 Jennifer Rhodes as Penny Halliwell
 Finola Hughes as Patty Halliwell

Guest
 Audrey Wasilewski as Natalie
 Elizabeth Harnois as Brooke
 Rick Hearst as Troxa
 Eddie Cahill as Sean
 Harry Groener as Father Thomas
 Jason Carter as Andras
 Rainn Wilson as Kierkan
 Steve Valentine as Eames
 Dana Ashbrook as T.J.
 Simon Templeman as Angel of Death
 W. Earl Brown as Shadow
 Sherri Saum as Ariel
 Kevin Weisman as Lukas
 Ian Buchanan as Raynor
 Rachel Luttrell as Janna

Special Musical Guest 
 Barenaked Ladies
 Snake River Conspiracy
 Marvelous 3
Idol
 Fastball
 Box
 Orgy

Special Appearance by 
 Buff Bagwell as Slammer
 Booker T. Huffman as Thunder
 Scott Steiner as Mega-Man

Episodes

Notes

References

External links 
List of Charmed season 3 episodes at the Internet Movie Database
 

Charmed (TV series)
Charmed (TV series) episodes
2000 American television seasons
2001 American television seasons

bg:Списък с епизоди на Чародейките#Сезон 3